The Tulalip Tribes of Washington, formerly known as the Tulalip Tribes of the Tulalip Reservation, is a federally recognized tribe of Duwamish, Snohomish, Snoqualmie, Skagit, Suiattle, Samish, and Stillaguamish people. They are South and Central Coast Salish peoples of indigenous peoples of the Pacific Northwest Coast. Their tribes are located in the mid-Puget Sound region of Washington.

In November 2002, John McCoy, a Tulalip leader, was elected to the Washington State legislature, retired in April 2020. For a time he served as the only Native American in the legislature, joining Jeff Morris, an Alaskan Native (Tsimpshian) who was elected in 1996 with two other Alaskan Natives, Dino Rossi (Tlinget) and Jim Dunn (Aleut). In 2002 the Tulalip Tribes also exerted political power by allying with other tribes across the state and defeating a state Supreme Court candidate "with a long track record of opposing tribal interests."

Name

The term Tulalip (originally ) comes from the Snohomish dialect. It was used in 1855 to describe the tribes who joined together on the Tulalip Reservation established by treaty with the federal government. They included the Duwamish, Snohomish, Snoqualmie, Skagit, Suiattle, Samish, and Stillaguamish peoples, all of whom are South and Central Coast Salish peoples.

Reservation

The Tulalip Indian Reservation was established by the Treaty of Point Elliot in 1855 and by Executive Order of US President Ulysses S. Grant on January 22, 1873. The reservation lies on Port Susan in western Snohomish County, adjacent to the western border of the city of Marysville. Its largest community is Tulalip Bay.

The Tulalip people settled onto reservation lands after signing the Point Elliott Treaty with the former Washington Territory on January 22, 1855. The reservation now comprises the western half of the Marysville-Tulalip community, which was divided by the 20th-century construction of Interstate 5. Marysville is an incorporated city and lies east of the freeway.

The Marysville School District serves both the city and the reservation. To accommodate a growing population, in 2008 it opened three new schools, built of prefab, modular units that operate and look like traditional construction, at its site on the reservation. This large campus is now called the Marysville Secondary Campus; it contains Heritage High School, Marysville Arts and Technology High School, and an elementary school. The two high schools share a gym and commons center.

Economy
The tribe has developed Quil Ceda Village as a municipality within the reservation. It also developed a business park to provide jobs and tax income for the tribe, and to diversify its economy. Situated alongside Interstate 5, the business park includes the tribe's first gaming casino, Quil Ceda Creek Casino; the second, the $72 million Tulalip Resort Casino, and a $130 million associated 12-story luxury hotel.

Retail businesses include Walmart and Home Depot. In 2004, the tribe signed a deal with Chelsea Property Group to develop an outlet mall on the reservation. The company agreed to develop 100 to 120 stores on 47 acres of land near the tribe's casino and the Quil Ceda Business Park. The contract is expected to yield $1.2 million annually in revenues for the tribe. The deal runs for 75 years. The outlet mall, Seattle Premium Outlet, opened in 2005; a variety of restaurants have also opened.

The center includes museum exhibits of Tulalip history and artifacts, classrooms, an archaeological repository, a longhouse, and research library. Attached is a  nature preserve.

Communities

Cathan
John Sam Lake
Priest Point
Quil Ceda Village
Shaker Church
Stimson Crossing
Tulalip Bay
Weallup Lake

Government

The Tulalip Tribes are headquartered in Tulalip, Washington.  The tribe is governed by a seven-member, democratically elected General Council, whose members fill designated roles as officers and boardmembers. The current tribal administration is as follows:

 Chairwoman: Teri Gobin
 Vice Chairwoman: Misty Napeahi
 Treasurer: Pat Contraro
 Secretary: Debra Posey
 Board member: Melvin Sheldon, Jr.
 Board member: Hazen Shopbell
 Board member: Marie Zackuse 

The Tulalip Tribes has defined its rules for membership in the tribe. Membership is based on January 1, 1935 Tulalip census roll; new applicants must prove descent from persons on that roll and that their parents were residents of the Tulalip Reservation at the time of the individual's birth. It does not require a minimum blood quantum.

Judicial system: Pilot project of VAWA 2013

The US Supreme Court's majority opinion in Oliphant v. Suquamish Indian Tribe (1978) affirmed that tribal courts were not allowed to have jurisdiction over a non-Indian person in a criminal case on the reservation. Through the passage of the Violence Against Women Reauthorization Act of 2013 (VAWA 2013), signed into law on March 7, 2013 by President Barack Obama, tribal courts have been authorized to exercise special criminal jurisdiction over certain crimes of domestic and dating violence.

This new law generally took effect on March 7, 2015. It also authorized a voluntary "Pilot Project" to allow certain tribes to begin exercising special jurisdiction beginning February 20, 2014.<ref name="justice" Three tribes were selected for this Pilot Project: the Confederated Tribes of the Umatilla Indian Reservation (Oregon), the Pascua Yaqui Tribe (Arizona), and the Tulalip Tribes of Washington.

Language
The tribes speak English and Lushootseed, a Central Salish language. The language is written in the Latin script. A dictionary and grammar have been published. The tribe established its own language department in the 1990s to promote and preserve the use of Lushootseed across the region. Marysville Pilchuck High School began offering Lushootseed classes to its students in 2019.

Economic development

The Tulalip Tribes own and operate Tulalip Bingo, Quil Ceda Deli, Tulalip Casino, Canoes Carvery, Cedars Cafe, Eagles Buffet, Tulalip Bay Restaurant, Journeys East, The Draft Sports Bar & Grill, Tulalip Resort Casino, Quil Ceda Creek Nightclub and Casino, Torch Grill, and Q Burgers, all located in Tulalip, Washington. With revenues generated by their successful casinos, they have invested and developed other businesses to diversify their economy.

The tribe began development of a major shopping and business center along Interstate 5 in the 1990s, aiming to attract the auxiliary support facility of Naval Station Everett as its main tenant, but an agreement broke down. The  center, named Quil Ceda Village, was built in the early 2000s alongside a new casino and outlet mall.

The Tulalip Tribes has begun to act more in local and state politics, at times in alliance with other Native American tribes in the state. In November 2002, John McCoy, a longtime Tulalip leader, was elected to the Washington state legislature, where he first served as the only Native American member.

In addition, in the 2002 election, the Tulalip worked with other tribes in the state to defeat a candidate for the state Supreme Court who had a long record of opposing tribal interests.

Seven other Native Americans have since been elected to the state legislature, including Julie Johnson (Lummi). Only one Native American state representative is Republican; all the others are members of the Democratic Party.

Events
The tribes host numerous annual events, including Treaty Days, typically in January to commemorate the signing of the Point Elliot Treaty on January 22, 1855; First King Salmon Ceremony, to bless the fishermen and celebrate catching the first king salmon of the season; Winter Dancing; and a Veteran's Pow Wow during the first weekend of every June.

References

Further reading
 Pritzker, Barry M. A Native American Encyclopedia: History, Culture, and Peoples. Oxford: Oxford University Press, 2000. .

External links
 
 Tulalip Tribes, official website
 Tulalip Tribes Codes
 Tulalip Lushootseed, language project
 Fishing rights / Tulalip tribes vs. Suquamish Indian tribe

Coast Salish
Duwamish tribe
Native American tribes in Washington (state)
Geography of Snohomish County, Washington
Federally recognized tribes in the United States
Indigenous peoples of the Pacific Northwest Coast
Tulalip Tribes